Yves Vincent (5 August 1921 – 6 January 2016) was a French film and television actor.

Biography 
Born in Haute-Savoie , Yves Vincent spent a large part of his youth in Algeria where he started out in the troupe of the Comédie de Radio-Algérie.

In cinema, he made his first film in 1944 in Cairo with his mother, the prelude to a long career.

He appeared in numerous television films and soap operas. Between 1988 and 1991 , he played Judge Garonne in the television series Tribunal.

In October 2013, he published his memoirs: Do you want to smile with me?, published by Christian Navarro, where he recounts, among other things, his relationship with Ingrid Bergman , Edwige Feuillère and Brigitte Bardot. In 2015, with the same publisher, he published the novel Des Vagues à l'Âme. In late 2016, the actor's last autobiographical work was released posthumously: "4, boulevard Laferrière" (ed. Christian Navarro), in which he reveals fragments of his childhood and adolescence, as if his own disappearance was not an end.

His funeral took place onJanuary 13 , 2016 in a civil ceremony at the Joigny crematorium .

Selected filmography

 Devil and the Angel (1946) - Robert
 La taverne du poisson couronné (1947) - Pierre Astor
 The Sharks of Gibraltar (1947) - André Duval
 La renégate (1948) - Jean Costa
 Le cavalier de Croix-Mort (1948) - Simon de Chabre
 The Cupid Club (1949) - Morezzi
 La maternelle (1949) - Dr. Libois
 La femme nue (1949) - Pierre Bernier
 The Dancer of Marrakesh (1949) - Jean Portal
 Beware of Blondes (1950) - Luigi Costelli
 Oriental Port (1950) - Vaucourt
 Captain Ardant (1951) - Le capitaine Pierre Ardant
 Tapage nocturne (1951) - Frank Varescot
 My Wife Is Formidable (1951) - Le trompettiste (uncredited)
 Si ça vous chante (1951)
 Ouvert contre X... (1952) - L'inspecteur Richard
 Grand Gala (1952) - Pierre Bouvais
 Sins of Rome (1953) - Octavius
 Monsieur Scrupule, Gangster (1953) - M. Scrupule
 Pity for the Vamps (1956) - André Larcher
 Le circuit de minuit (1956) - Jean Gaillard
 OSS 117 Is Not Dead (1957) - Boris Obarian
 Police judiciaire (1958) - Inspecteur Giverny
 Babette Goes to War (1959) - Capt. Darcy
 Ce soir on tue (1959) - Le commissaire Van Eck
 La dragée haute (1960) - De Marchelier
 Alibi pour un meurtre (1961) - Ciello
 Les nouveaux aristocrates (1961) - Le docteur Pierre Prullé-Rousseau
 The Hideout (1962) - Doctor
 Knights of Terror (1963) - Capitano Mirko
 Muriel (1963) - L'homme du couple d'acheteurs
 Anatomy of a Marriage: My Days with Jean-Marc (1964) - Granjouan
 Anatomy of a Marriage: My Days with Françoise (1964) - Granjouan
 Your Turn to Die (1967) - Felton
 Le gendarme se marie (1968) - Le colonel
 Hibernatus (1969) - Edouard Crépin-Jaujard
 Her and She and Him (1970) - Mathias Decas
 Le gendarme en balade (1970) - Le colonel de gendarmerie examinateur
 Libido: The Urge to Love (1971) - The priest
 Valparaiso, Valparaiso (1971) - Le maître de maison
 Impossible Is Not French (1974) - Nadar
 Les filles de Grenoble (1981) - Le conseiller
 Surprise Party (1983) - M. Bazin
 La rumba (1987) - Del Monte, l'ambassadeur d'Italie
 La maison assassinée (1988) - The judge

References

Bibliography
 Goble, Alan. The Complete Index to Literary Sources in Film. Walter de Gruyter, 1999.

External links

People from Haute-Savoie
1921 births
2016 deaths
French male television actors
French male film actors